The Central News Agency Literary Award (CNA Literary Award, CNA Prize) was a major annual literary award in South Africa. It was named for the CNA chain of bookstores. Founded by Phillip Stein, it recognised works in prose and poetry, and in both the English language and Afrikaans.

The last award was presented in 1996, although CNA later launched a "Book of the Year" award for popular bestsellers of any genre.

Past winners (incomplete list)

This list is based on multiple sources that may contain errors.

See also
 Alan Paton Award
 Amstel Playwright of the Year Award
 Hertzog Prize
 W.A. Hofmeyr Prize

Notes
9 From the menu for the CNA Literary Awards for 1986

South African literary awards
South African literary events
Awards disestablished in 1996
1996 disestablishments in South Africa